Crepidogastrillus curtulus is a species of beetle in the family Carabidae, the only species in the genus Crepidogastrillus.

References

Brachininae